Lucius Fundanius Lamia Aelianus was a Roman senator active in the reigns of Trajan and Hadrian.

Biography

Early life
Lamia Aelianus was possibly the son of the empress Domitia Longina and Lucius Aelius Lamia Plautius Aelianus or their maternal grandson through a daughter Aelia Plautia and her husband a Lucius Fundanius, son of a Lucius Fundanius. Ronald Syme identifies Lamia Aelianus as the brother of the surmised but undocumented Plautia, who was married three times, and whose children married into the Antonine dynasty.

Career
He was ordinary consul in 116 with Sextus Carminius Vetus as his colleague. He was later proconsular governor of Asia during 131 and 132.

Family
He married Rupilia, sister of Rupilia Faustina, wife of Marcus Annius Verus, three times consul, and perhaps daughter of Lucius Scribonius Libo Rupilius Frugi Bonus and wife Salonia Matidia, maternal niece of Trajan, and had two known children, a son and a daughter. Their son was Lucius Plautius Lamia Silvanus, consul in 145. Their daughter was Fundania, whose existence is inferred from the name of her daughter Annia Fundania Faustina, daughter of Marcus Annius Libo, consul in 128, and thus Libo's wife.

See also 
 List of Roman consuls

References 

1st-century Romans
2nd-century Romans
Imperial Roman consuls
Roman governors of Asia
Year of birth unknown
Year of death unknown
Fundanii